Timarete (or Thamyris, Tamaris, Thamar; 5th century BC), was an ancient Greek painter.

She was the daughter of the painter Micon the Younger of Athens.  According to Pliny the Elder, she "scorned the duties of women and practised her father's art." At the time of Archelaus I of Macedon she was best known for a panel painting of the goddess Diana that was kept at Ephesus, a city that the goddess. While it is no longer extant, it was kept at Ephesus for many years.

She is one of the six female artists of antiquity mentioned in Pliny the Elder's Natural History (XL.147–148) in A.D. 77: Timarete, Irene, Calypso, Aristarete, Iaia, Olympias. They are mentioned later in Boccaccio's De mulieribus claris.

Primary sources
Pliny the Elder Naturalis historia xxxv.35.59, 40.147.

Secondary sources
Chadwick, Whitney. Women, Art, and Society. Thames and Hudson, London, 1990.
Harris, Anne Sutherland and Linda Nochlin. Women Artists: 1550–1950. Los Angeles County Museum of Art, Knopf, New York, 1976.

Citations

Ancient Athenian women
Artists of ancient Attica
Ephesus
Ancient Greek painters
Ancient Greek women artists
Greek women painters
5th-century BC Greek women
5th-century BC painters